St. Columba is a traditional Irish tune. It was first published by George Petrie in 1855, and it was republished in Charles Villiers Stanford's edited compilation of the tunes Petrie collected. It was described as having been "sung on the dedication of a chapel" in County Londonderry. The tune was paired with the hymn The King of Love My Shepherd Is in The English Hymnal (1906), and it rose in popularity with the hymn.

St Columba was a traditional Irish folk melody that was put to words by Charles Coffin.  It was then translated into English by John Chandler, with the chorus 'All glory to the Father be'.  In the eighteenth century the hymn Sol praeceps rapitur was translated by the prolific Edward Caswall in seven verses.  The music was set by Victorian H. S. Irons, who died in 1905.

References 

Hymn tunes
Irish music